James Bentley (born 19 October 1997) is an Ireland international rugby league footballer who plays as a  or  for the Leeds Rhinos in the Super League.

He played for the Bradford Bulls in the Championship. Bentley played for St Helens in the Betfred Super League and spent time on loan from Saints at the Sheffield Eagles and the Leigh Centurions in the Betfred Championship.

Background
Bentley was born in Leeds, West Yorkshire, England.

Playing career

Early career
Bentley started his path towards a professional Rugby League career at Featherstone Rovers in the scholarship ranks after coming from nearby, Oulton Raiders. After his first season with the club, no game time and a change of coaching staff, he followed the fellow coaching staff to Bradford Bulls.

Bradford Bulls
Bentley came up through the Bradford Bulls academy and made his initial appearance for the Bradford Bulls in 2016 against the Castleford Tigers in a pre season game and went on to make sporadic appearances throughout 2016. Bentley cemented his place in the Bradford Bulls first team in 2017. Despite the club's 12 point deduction, Bentley impressed scoring 18 tries. After the Bradford Bulls were relegated, Bentley signed for Super League side St. Helens.

St Helens
At the end of the 2017 season Bentley signed a two-year deal with Super League side St. Helens. He joined the Sheffield Eagles on Rugby League Dual registration in 2018 as part of a deal between the two clubs. He played for Sheffield against the Dewsbury Rams.
He played in St Helens 8-4 2020 Super League Grand Final victory over Wigan at the Kingston Communications Stadium in Hull.  He signed a one-year contract extension with St Helens for the 2021 season.
On 4 May 2021, he was ruled out for an indefinite period after suffering a badly broken leg.

Leeds
On 21 June 2021, it was reported that he had signed for Leeds in the Super League
In round 1 of the 2022 Super League season, Bentley made his club debut for Leeds against Warrington but was sent off after only 16 minutes on the field.
On 23 May 2022, Bentley was suspended for three matches in relation to a dangerous high tackle during Leeds victory over Wakefield Trinity.
In round 16 of the 2022 Super League season, Bentley was sent to the sin bin for a professional foul during Leeds 42-12 loss against his former club St Helens.
In the 2022 Semi-Final, Bentley scored two tries for Leeds in a shock 20-8 victory over Wigan which sent the club into the Grand Final.
On 24 September 2022, Bentley played for Leeds in their 24-12 loss to St Helens RFC in the 2022 Super League Grand Final.
Bentley represented Ireland at the 2021 Rugby League World Cup and played in all three group stage matches. On 14 November, the Rugby Football League placed Bentley under investigation after he was alleged to have been involved in a fight with England and Sydney Roosters player Victor Radley at England's team hotel.

Statistics
Statistics do not include pre-season friendlies.

References

External links

St Helens profile
Bradford Bulls profile
SL profile
Saints Heritage Society profile
Ireland profile

1996 births
Living people
Bradford Bulls players
English people of Irish descent
English rugby league players
Ireland national rugby league team players
Leeds Rhinos players
Leigh Leopards players
Rugby league locks
Rugby league hookers
Rugby league players from Leeds
Sheffield Eagles players
St Helens R.F.C. players